Presidential elections were held in Colombia on 27 May 2018. As no candidate received a majority of the vote, the second round of voting was held on 17 June. Incumbent president Juan Manuel Santos was ineligible to seek a third term. Iván Duque, a senator, defeated Gustavo Petro, former mayor of Bogotá, in the second round. Duque's victory made him one of the youngest individuals elected to the presidency, aged 42. His running mate, Marta Lucía Ramírez, was the first woman elected to the vice presidency in Colombian history.

The election was held following a peace agreement between the government and the Revolutionary Armed Forces of Colombia (FARC) in 2016, ending over 50 years of conflict. The elections were the first to occur since congress passed legislation in 2015 modifying the presidential term limits, restricting presidents to one four-year term with a formal ban on re-election. The bill also granted the runner-up candidate in a presidential election a seat in the senate, whilst their running mate would become a member of the chamber of representatives.   

Duque, a lawyer and protege of former president Álvaro Uribe, was the nominee for the Democratic Center party. Duque, who was mostly unknown to the public before the election, had a platform encompassing support for innovation, economic recovery and staunch opposition to the peace agreement. 

Petro, a former AD/M-19 member and nominee for the Humane Colombia party, ran a progressive populist campaign that focused on reducing inequality and implementing universal healthcare and environmental protection. Petro narrowly surpassed centrist candidate Sergio Fajardo in the first round by just over 1%, permitting him to qualify for the run-off. 

Duque was victorious in the second round, earning 54% of the vote to Petro's 41%. Duque won 24 of Colombia's 32 departments, performed well in the inland regions and received over 77% of the vote in the Andean department of Norte de Santander. Duque assumed office on 7 August. Meanwhile, Petro became a senator, whilst his running mate, Ángela Robledo, became a member of the chamber of representatives.

Background 

During the previous election held in 2014, a second round was held as no candidate attained more than 50% of the vote. The candidates were incumbent president Juan Manuel Santos of the Party of the U and Óscar Iván Zuluaga of the Democratic Center. The election centred on the issue of how to continue peace negotiations with the Revolutionary Armed Forces of Colombia (FARC). In the run-off, Santos defeated Zuluaga, earning 50% of the vote to his opponent's 44%.

In June 2015, both houses of congress approved legislation limiting presidents to a single four-year term with a formal ban on re-election, restoring the term limits that were in place before 2005. President Santos, who submitted the bill upon re-election in the 2014 presidential election, said the re-election ban would restore a balance of power in Colombia. The bill faced criticism from supporters and members of the Democratic Center party led by former president and rival of Santos, Álvaro Uribe. They argued the purpose of the bill's introduction was to prevent Uribe from seeking a non-consecutive third term to the presidency. Edward Rodríguez, a Democratic Center member of congress, described the re-election ban as "revenge against Uribe".

On 27 September 2016, the government signed a peace agreement with the FARC. A referendum took place on 12 October to ratify the deal; however, voters narrowly rejected it. President Santos then negotiated with staunch opponents of the agreement like Uribe and reentered into talks with the FARC. The FARC and the Colombian government agreed to a revised peace deal on 24 November. The modified agreement included changes, such as an agreement that the deal would not be part of the constitution. Rather than put the revised deal through another referendum for ratification, Santos sent the agreement to congress. The Senate voted to ratify the deal on 29 November, which was followed by the approval by the chamber of representatives. The ratification marked an end to 50 years of conflict.

Electoral system
Colombian Presidents are elected for four-year terms using a two-round system; if no candidate receives a majority of the vote in the first round, a runoff is held between the top two candidates. The Vice President is elected on the same ticket as the President. Presidents are limited to a single four-year term and Article 191 of the constitution requires candidates to be Colombian by birth and at least thirty years old.  

In line with the constitution, Colombian citizens by birth or by naturalization, aged eighteen or older have the right to vote. Several scenarios can cause the loss of the right to vote, as outlined in the constitution. Citizens in detention centers can vote from the establishments determined by the National Civil Registry. The civil registry inscription is not automatic, and citizens must go to the regional office of the Registry to register.

Legislative act # 2 of 2015 established that the runner-up in the presidential elections is given a seat in the Senate and their Vice President candidate will become a member of the House of Representatives.

Candidates 

The following lists display candidates in the order they appeared on the ballot and show the most recent political office they have held as of the time of the election.

Candidates in the runoff

Candidates not in the runoff

Electoral Alliances

Candidates that withdrew
The Common Alternative Revolutionary Force withdrew its presidential aspiration on 9 March 2018, stating the health problems of its candidate Rodrigo Londoño, as the reason.

Juan Carlos Pinzón, who had previously served as defence minister and ambassador to the United States under president Juan Manuel Santos, launched his candidacy for Casa de Nariño in 2017. Pinzón withdrew from the race on 16 March 2018 to become Vargas Lleras' running mate.

Piedad Córdoba and her vice presidential candidate Jaime Araújo Rentería terminated their candidacy on 9 April 2018.

Viviane Morales and her vice presidential candidate Jorge Leyva Durán, of the Somos Región Colombia party, retired their candidacy on 2 May 2018. After, Morales adhered to Iván Duque's campaign, while Leyva joined Germán Vargas Lleras' candidacy.

Primaries 

Two coalitions, the right-wing Great Alliance for Colombia and left-wing Social Inclusion for Peace, held primary elections concurrently with the legislative elections on 11 March.

Great Alliance for Colombia 
Three candidates sought the nomination of the conservative Great Alliance for Colombia:

 Iván Duque of the Democratic Center, a young lawyer who had served in the senate since 2014.

 Marta Lucía Ramírez, formerly a Conservative party member, sought the nomination as an independent. Ramírez served as defence minister to Álvaro Uribe from 2002 to 2003 and was the first woman to hold that position. She had most recently served as a senator.

 Alejandro Ordóñez, a former inspector-general who competed as a member of the La Patria de Pie party.

Results 

Duque won the nomination, and following his victory, he selected the runner-up, Ramírez, to be the alliance's vice presidential nominee.

Social Inclusion for Peace 

The progressive Social Inclusion for Peace alliance was composed of Humane Colombia, the Indigenous and Social Alternative Movement, Patriotic Union and the List of Decency coalition. Two candidates sought the alliance's nomination:

 Gustavo Petro of Humane Colombia was also endorsed by the Indigenous and Social Alternative Movement (MAIS). He had most recently served as mayor of Bogotá.

 Carlos Caceido, a member of the Citizen Force party and former mayor of Santa Marta, advocated for the government to engage in peace talks with the ELN.

Results 

Petro secured the nomination by a large margin and won all departments, losing only in Caceido's home department of Magdalena. Following the primary election, Petro selected Ángela Robledo of the Green Alliance and a member of the chamber of representatives as his running mate.

Campaign 

According to polling data, significant issues amongst voters were unemployment, healthcare, corruption and the FARC peace agreement.

Iván Duque, a lawyer, senator, protege of Uribe, and the nominee for the Democratic Center party, campaigned on promoting innovation, job creation, economic recovery, environmental preservation and opposing the FARC peace agreement. Before his nomination, most of the public was not familiar with Duque. He rose to prominence during the 2016 peace referendum due to his staunch opposition. However, he stated that Duque was still in favour of peace but aimed to keep the FARC out of Colombian politics and prosecute FARC and National Liberation Army (ELN) rebels. On narcotics, Duque expressed his support for the war on drugs and sought to eliminate all coca production. He emphasised a message of opposing corruption and implementing economic reform; for instance; he proposed a simplification of the tax code. Due to Duque's youth and light experience, opponents and critics painted him as unprepared to head the executive branch, leading some to claim further that the senator was a puppet of Uribe. Duque countered these claims by saying it was time for a new generation to take over, and whilst he did highlight his close ties to Uribe, he emphasised that he was "his own man". Critics also attacked Duque for his opposition to the peace agreement, his refusal to rule out fracking and alleged ties to paramilitary groups.

Economist Gustavo Petro of Humane Colombia, a former mayor of Bogotá and former M-19 guerilla who was previously a candidate in the 2010 presidential election, ran a populist campaign focusing on decreasing inequality and tackling climate change. Supported by a coalition of left and centre-left parties, Petro also emphasised workers' rights and campaigned to improve labour conditions in both urban and rural areas. He aimed to reduce poverty by implementing land reforms and establishing a "popular bank" that would offer loans to impoverished citizens. Petro supported the introduction of state-funded universal healthcare that would replace the unpopular private-funded system. Furthermore, he sought to restrict the use of fossil fuels and intended to ban any further exploration of mining and fracking in favour of renewable energy sources. Several months before the election, Petro survived an assassination attempt when a bullet pierced through his armoured van. He presented himself as a successor to prominent slain left-wing politicians such as Jorge Eliecer Gaitan and Luis Carlos Galán. Petro furthermore highlighted the need to end political persecution in the country. Petro's opponents claimed that he would "turn Colombia into another Venezuela", citing his prior support for former Venezuelan president Hugo Chávez. Critics said his policy proposals would not attract foreign investment and that his plans to abandon non-renewable energy, which accounted for 2-4% of Colombia's GDP, were not feasible at the time. Opponents also claimed that his policies would result in an economic disaster.

Veteran politician Humberto De la Calle, who served as vice president to Ernesto Samper, was the nominee for the Colombian Liberal Party. De la Calle played a crucial role in negotiating the peace deal with the FARC and campaigned on policies to assist the country post-conflict, including investments in job creation and regions that were heavily affected by the conflict. He entered the presidential race to keep Duque from winning the presidency. De la Calle supported increasing environmental protection and stricter criteria for the issue of mining licenses, both as a means of promoting ecotourism. Due to the high presence of labour inequality and gender-based violence, De la Calle announced his intention to establish a ministry of women to tackle these issues. He furthermore proposed a significant reform of the education sector, seeking to transform the financing and structure and change the ministry of education to the ministry of intelligence. De la Calle's proposals included other policies with broad support amongst the youth, such as modifying the unpopular student loan program and abolishing compulsory military service. Whilst on the campaign trail, De la Calle struggled to gain momentum and often trailed his opponents in the polls. The peace agreement, a controversial topic amongst voters, did not help boost support for De la Calle. His 30 years of political experience proved a double-edged sword; some voters saw this as a benefit, but others concluded that De la Calle was a part of the elite. The Liberal party's severe dis-unity and rupturing also hurt him. But De la Calle's campaign suffered a severe downturn when Liberal party leader and former president César Gaviria announced before the first round that the Liberal party would support Duque in the run-off, implying that the party had lost confidence in De la Calle's candidacy.

Sergio Fajardo, a mathematician, former mayor of Medellín, former governor of Antioquia and previously a vice presidential candidate in the 2010 presidential election, won the nomination of the Colombia Coalition, an alliance composed of the Alternative Democratic Pole, the Green Alliance and his Civic Compromise party. Fajardo's platform encompassed education and the environment. He intended to increase the education budget by 10% and boost enrollment nationwide to combat poverty. Fajardo supported the peace agreement, although he presented himself as a moderate centrist alternative to Duque and Petro. On the campaign trail, Fajardo expressed concern about vote buying and advocated for a transparent electoral and judicial process. Whilst he campaigned on being the fiscally reliable candidate, he faced criticism from opponents who highlighted a dramatic debt increase that occurred during his tenure as governor of Antioquia. Fajardo considered polarisation a threat to Colombian politics and sought to present himself as a middle-ground candidate. However, critics said this strategy risked Fajardo appealing to few voters.

Jorge Antonio Trujillo, a Christian pastor and former senator, was the nominee for the We Are All Colombia party. Trujillo, the founder of the gospel church of Casa de Reino, gained widespread attention in 2014 when he claimed that the winter wave the country experienced was a punishment from God and blamed President Santos, claiming that the president had previously travelled to the Sierra Nevada de Santa Marta mountains where he made a "secret rite" and "handed over the country to the shamans and sorcerers." Whilst campaigning, Trujillo frequently mentioned that his most fundamental priorities were in the following order: God, family, the Church and the nation. An opponent of LGBT rights, Trujillo pledged to prevent LGBT couples from legally adopting children and outlaw same-sex marriage. Trujillo was opposed to the peace agreement, claiming it violated the constitution. Rarely holding public rallies, he instead preached his campaign messages through his church services. Trujillo performed poorly in opinion polls, although the pastor claimed to have faced discrimination from the national electoral council and pollsters. However, Trujillo assured voters he had faith that God would provide an "electoral surprise" in the first round and qualify for the run-off.

Germán Vargas Lleras of the conservative Radical Change party and vice president to Juan Manuel Santos resigned as second-in-command in March 2017 to be eligible to contest the presidency. Vargas Lleras ran as an independent; at a time when various members of his party were under investigation for corruption. Vargas Lleras led in many early polls and with the support of the Mejor Vargas Lleras coalition; the former vice
president campaigned on his experience, pledging to continue many policies of the Santos administration, for example, resuming the 4G road network infrastructure that he played a part in initiating. On the economy, the former vice president supported lowering income taxes to attract more foreign investment and promote entrepreneurs, differing from the policy of the Santos administration. Furthermore, Vargas Lleras highlighted the Crisis in Venezuela during the campaign and expressed staunch opposition towards the Nicolás Maduro. On the campaign trail, Vargas Lleras claimed he was the candidate that would prevent Colombia from descending into a crisis like in Venezuela. The former vice president advocated for an end to corruption; however, this was complicated when opponents attacked Vargas Lleras for the corruption investigations surrounding the Radical Change party. Critics said his tax reform proposal would risk increasing inequality throughout Colombia and that the support from president Santos would prove to be a double-edged sword due to the outgoing administration's unpopularity. Furthermore, Vargas Lleras did not fully support the FARC peace agreement.

Debates 
There were four debates, which took place in the four main departments. 

The Antioquia debate was characterised by the lack of attacks made by the candidates. Topics included public order, Venezuelan immigration, the peace treaties with FARC and LGBT couples' rights. Regional topics included the Antioquia railroad, regional connectivity and tourist industry development.

The Caribe debate saw several disqualifications and confrontations between candidates, as well as incidents in the crowds between followers of different parties. Topics included the battle against corruption, the peace process with FARC, the environment and the country's relationship with Venezuelan. Regional topics included Electricaribe (an energy supplier in the Caribe region) and the decisions that the candidates would take to resolve the energy problem.

The Pacific debate saw discussions on flaws in the healthcare system, illegal mining, education, FARC, illegal crops, the battle against corruption, infrastructure, culture, racism and the exploitation of biodiversity. The candidates Humberto de La Calle and Germán Vargas Lleras took advantage of the free questions to comment on absent candidate, Iván Duque.

The Eje Cafetero debate was cancelled due to disturbances that prevented some candidates entering the  Los Fundadores de Manizales theatre. Afterwards Iván Duque, Humberto de La Calle, Gustavo Petro and Germán Vargas Lleras met at the city's auditorium and held a closed-door debate. The most important topics were the coffee industry and tourism.

Opinion polls

First round

2017
During the first round, six parties ran for the presidency. These candidates were; Iván Duque, Gustavo Petro, Sergio Fajardo, Germán Vargas Lleras, Humberto De la Calle and Jorge Antonio Trujillo. As none of the candidates received the majority of votes, the elections moved to a runoff between the top two candidates, Iván Duque and Gustavo Petro, which was held on 17 June 2018.

2018

Second round 
Former candidate of Sergio Fajardo, leader of Movimiento Compromiso Ciudadano, announced his blank vote for the second round, as well as former liberal candidate Humberto de La Calle, although his party joined Iván Duque's campaign. The Alternative Democratic Pole joined Gustavo Petro's campaign, but a minority sector led by Senator Jorge Robledo (MOIR) decided to vote blank too. The directive of the Green Alliance let their followers to choose between supporting Gustavo Petro or voting blank, but considered unacceptable to support Iván Duque. Movimiento Mejor Vargas Lleras and the Radical Change party sent their former candidate's program to Iván Duque, to consider it for a future government, although there was not an official adhesion. The Partido de la U  and the Social Party of National Unity encouraged their followers choose freely to vote for their preferred option.

Results  

Turnout in the first round was 53.40%. Iván Duque won a plurality of votes in the first round, securing 39.36% of the vote. Because he failed to attain the 50% required to win an outright victory, Duque, along with the second-place candidate Gustavo Petro who received 25.09%, competed in a second round. Petro narrowly surpassed Sergio Fajardo, denying the Colombia Coalition ticket a spot in the runoff. Blank ballots made up 1.75% of the votes cast.

Duque won a decisive victory in the run-off, earning 54.03%. Duque secured a majority of the vote in 23 departments and received a plurality in La Guajira, while his strongest showing was in Norte de Santander, where he earned 77%. Petro received 41% and won eight departments and Bogotá. He performed well in several coastal departments and received nearly 70% of the vote in the Amazonian department of Putumayo. Blank votes increased to 4.20%, whilst voter turnout was virtually identical to the first round at 53.11%. Duque became one of the youngest individuals elected to the presidency at age 42, whilst Marta Lucía Ramírez was the first woman elected vice president.

By department

First round

Second round

Notes

References

Colombia
Presidential election
May 2018 events in South America
Presidential elections in Colombia